The .35 Remington  is the only remaining cartridge from Remington's lineup of medium-power rimless cartridges still in commercial production. Introduced in 1906, it was originally chambered for the Remington Model 8 semi-automatic rifle in 1908.

It is also known as  Browning and 9 mm Don Gonzalo.

History
Over the years, the .35 Remington has been chambered in a variety of rifles by most firearms manufacturers, and continues in popularity today in the Marlin Model 336 lever-action and Henry Side Gate Lever Action. It is also a popular cartridge for single-shot hunting pistols like the Thompson/Center Contender and the Remington XP-100. For hunters looking for a medium-power rifle with moderate recoil, for short to medium ranges, the .35 Remington is popular alongside the .30-30 Winchester. It has a small but loyal following in the northeast and areas of the southern United States.

The cartridge uses a medium to heavy bullet and has moderate recoil based on a moderate pressure level of 33,500 CUP as set by SAAMI.  The normal factory load consists of a 200 grain round-nosed bullet with a muzzle velocity of 2080 feet per second. This 200 grain bullet is nearly 18% heavier than the .30-30's 170 grain bullet, and has a 16% larger frontal area. This gives it a substantial increase in power over the .30-30, especially when used on larger game species.

Remington helped promote the advantage in power that the .35 Remington had over the .30-30 through a series of advertising campaigns in the early 1900s. One of their advertisements even publicized the ability of the .35 Remington to penetrate a 5/16″ steel plate, which the .30-30 Winchester could not do.

The .35 Remington is considered a fine round for deer, elk, black bear, and other medium and large game as long as ranges are reasonable. Hornady currently produces a .35 Remington load in their LEVERevolution line that features a rubber-tipped spitzer bullet which is safe to use in lever action or pump guns with tubular magazines.

Dimensions

See also
 9 mm caliber
 List of rifle cartridges
 Table of handgun and rifle cartridges

References

External links

 .35 Remington
 The Enduring .35 Remington
 The .35 Remington: An underrated brush cartridge
 Head to Head: .30-30 Winchester vs. .35 Remington
 

.35 Remington firearms
Pistol and rifle cartridges
Remington Arms cartridges